The following events occurred in April 1956:

April 1, 1956 (Sunday)
Trans World Airlines Flight 400, a Martin 4-0-4, crashes on takeoff from Greater Pittsburgh International Airport in Pennsylvania, United States; 22 of the 36 people on board are killed, including one crew member.

April 2, 1956 (Monday)
The first episode of long-running US TV soap As the World Turns is broadcast on the CBS television network.
Northwest Orient Airlines Flight 2 is ditched in Puget Sound shortly after takeoff from Seattle-Tacoma International Airport, United States. All 38 people aboard manage to leave the plane, but four passengers and one crew member cannot be saved by rescuers.

April 3, 1956 (Tuesday)
April 1956 tornado outbreak: At the end of an outbreak that produced 47 tornadoes, including an F5 tornado that devastated the Hudsonville and Standale, Michigan, areas of the United States, 18 people are left dead and 340 injured, and the historic lighthouse at Saugatuck destroyed.

April 4, 1956 (Wednesday)
Senator Strom Thurmond resigns, keeping a campaign pledge he had made in the United States Senate election in South Carolina, 1954. Thurmond would be unopposed in his bid to complete the remaining four years of the term, thus avoiding a primary election.

April 5, 1956 (Thursday)
A 120mm mortar attack on Gaza City by the Israel Defense Forces kills 58 civilians, including 10 children, as a retribution for killing of three Israeli soldiers by Egyptian forces on the previous day. (→ Death and eulogy of Roi Rotberg).

April 6, 1956 (Friday)
Elvis Presley signs a three-picture contract with Paramount Pictures.
Born: Dilip Vengsarkar, Indian cricketer, in Rajapur Maharashtra

April 7, 1956 (Saturday)
Following the country's independence from France, Spain discontinues the Spanish protectorate in Morocco, ceding its territory to the newly established kingdom.

April 8, 1956 (Sunday)
The Seyhan Dam and hydroelectric plant is opened in Turkey.
The National Constituent Assembly of the newly independent Kingdom of Tunisia holds its opening session. Habib Bourguiba is elected President of the National Constituent Assembly.
In the Ribbon Creek incident, six members of U.S. Marine Platoon 71 drown during a night march at Marine Corps Recruit Depot Parris Island.

April 9, 1956 (Monday)
Swedish ore carrier MV Akka sinks in the Firth of Clyde, Scotland, with the loss of six of her 33 crew. 
The Norwegian Humanist Association is founded.

April 10, 1956 (Tuesday)
A Nat King Cole concert in Birmingham, Alabama, United States, is interrupted by three Ku Klux Klan members, who push Cole from his piano stool; all are later tried and convicted, but Cole would never again perform in his home state.

April 11, 1956 (Wednesday)
The 1956 World Table Tennis Championships comes to an end in Tokyo, Japan. The host country finishes with four of the seven available gold medals, Romania with two, and the United States with one.

April 12, 1956 (Thursday)
Born: 
Andy García, Cuban actor, in Havana, under the name Andrés Arturo García Menéndez
Yasuo Tanaka, Japanese novelist and politician, in Tokyo
Died: Samuel J. Seymour, last surviving witness of the Assassination of Abraham Lincoln

April 13, 1956 (Friday)
Vietnamese rebel leader Ba Cụt is arrested by a South Vietnam government patrol, following the defeat of his forces.
Born: David W. Brown, entrepreneur, AOL founder, created AIM

April 14, 1956 (Saturday)
Ampex demonstrates videotape the VR-1000, the first of its line of 2 inch Quadruplex videotape recorders at the 1956 NARTB (now NAB) convention in Chicago, United States. Later the same year, the first television network programme to use the new Ampex Quadruplex recording system will be shown on CBS.
Born: Barbara Bonney, US soprano, in Montclair, New Jersey

April 15, 1956 (Sunday)
1956 McDonald Chapel tornado: A tornado strikes the Greater Birmingham area of Jefferson County, Alabama, United States. Twenty-five people are killed and 400 homes damaged.
The 65th Argentine Primera División football season begins.
The 1956 Syracuse Grand Prix is held in Sicily, and is won by Juan Manuel Fangio.
Died: Kathleen Howard, 71, Canadian singer and actress

April 16, 1956 (Monday)
Born: David M. Brown, US astronaut, in Arlington County, Virginia (died 2003 on the Space Shuttle Columbia)

April 17, 1956 (Tuesday)

Dutch cargo ship MV Altair strikes a rock off Borborema, Brazil, and sinks. All crew members are rescued.
The UK Chancellor of the Exchequer, Harold Macmillan, announces the launch of Premium Bonds in the United Kingdom.
The 4.9 km2 Chew Valley Lake in Somerset, UK, a new reservoir built by Bristol Water, is officially opened by Queen Elizabeth II of the United Kingdom.
Luis Aparicio replaces fellow Venezuelan baseball player Chico Carrasquel as the Chicago White Sox regular shortstop.

April 18, 1956 (Wednesday)
US actress Grace Kelly marries Rainier III, Prince of Monaco, in a civil ceremony at the Prince's Palace of Monaco.
Maria Desylla-Kapodistria becomes Greece's first elected female mayor, when she is elected in Corfu.

April 19, 1956 (Thursday)
British MI6 diver Lionel "Buster" Crabb is sent into Portsmouth harbour to investigate the visiting Soviet cruiser Ordzhonikidze. After diving in, he is never seen again. The UK government declines to give any further information.
Died: Ernst Robert Curtius, 70, German philologist

April 20, 1956 (Friday)
Born: Beatrice Ask, Swedish politician, in Sveg

April 21, 1956 (Saturday)
Margaret Truman, daughter and later biographer of former US President Harry S. Truman, marries journalist Clifton Daniel at Trinity Episcopal Church in Independence, Missouri.
Typhoon Thelma hits the Philippine Islands.
Died: Charles MacArthur, 60, US playwright and screenwriter

April 22, 1956 (Sunday)
The 1956 All-Ireland Senior Hurling Championship begins with the quarter-finals of the Leinster Senior Hurling Championship.

April 23, 1956 (Monday)
British writer C. S. Lewis marries US poet Joy Gresham in a civil ceremony at the Oxford register office, UK; as a divorcee, Gresham could not marry in an Anglican church.

April 24, 1956 (Tuesday)
The Australian Navy's new aircraft carrier HMAS Melbourne docks at Fremantle after her six-week maiden voyage from Glasgow, UK, to Australia.

April 25, 1956 (Wednesday)
The report of the Board of Inquiry into the 1956 Hawker Hunter multiple aircraft accident reports that the primary cause of the accident was a sudden deterioration in the weather, but that it had been an error of judgement to divert the aircraft on the assumption that they could perform a visual landing.
Born: Dominique Blanc, French actress, in Lyon

April 26, 1956 (Thursday)
Died: Edward Arnold, 66, US actor (cerebral hemorrhage)

April 27, 1956 (Friday)
World heavyweight champion Rocky Marciano announces his retirement, aged 32, from professional boxing without having lost any of his 49 bouts.

Portuguese cargo ship SS Luabo sinks off the coast of Mozambique, with the loss of fourteen of her 57 crew.
The first round of voting in the Burmese general election takes place, resulting in a majority for the Anti-Fascist People's Freedom League, led by U Nu, in the Burmese Chamber of Deputies.

April 28, 1956 (Saturday)
France completes its military withdrawal from Vietnam with the last of the French Expeditionary Force leaving the country. 
The Canadian Pacific Railway discontinues its Imperial Limited passenger service, its premier passenger train between Montreal and Vancouver, which had been running since 1899, because of the loss of its contract with Royal Mail.

April 29, 1956 (Sunday)
The 13th season of Germany's DFB-Pokal football competition begins with a qualifying match between Spandauer SV and FK Pirmasens.

April 30, 1956 (Monday)
Death and eulogy of Roi Rotberg, a kibbutz security officer killed yesterday near the Gaza Strip.
The 10th annual draft of the United States National Basketball Association is held in New York City.
Born: Lars von Trier, Danish film director and screenwriter, in Kongens Lyngby
Died: Alben W. Barkley, 78, US politician, 35th Vice President of the United States

References

1956
1956-04
1956-04